Perali is a village in Guntur district of the Indian state of Andhra Pradesh. It is located in Karlapalem mandal of Tenali revenue division.

Geography 

Governance 

Perali gram panchayat is the local self-government of the village. It is divided into wards and each ward is represented by a ward member.

Education 

As per the school information report for the academic year 2018–19, the village has 14 schools. These include 4 private and 10 Zilla/Mandal Parishad schools.

See also 
List of villages in Guntur district

References 

Villages in Guntur district